Shrier is a surname, an Americanized form of the German surname Schreier. Notable people with the surname include:

Alvin Shrier, Canadian physiologist
David Shrier, American futurist, author and entrepreneur

References

Americanized surnames
Surnames of German origin